Maljeva is populated plece in  Bosnia and Herzegovina, Republika Srpska, Kotor-Varoš Municipality. In 1991, the population was 595, and the 2013 census counted 223 inhabitants.

Population

References

Villages in Republika Srpska
Kotor Varoš